The 2015–16 Saint Joseph's Hawks women's basketball team will represent the Saint Joseph's University during the 2015–16 college basketball season. The Hawks, led by fifteenth year head coach Cindy Griffin. The Hawks were members of the Atlantic 10 Conference and play their home games at Hagan Arena. They finished the season 14–15, 8–8 in A-10 play to finish in a tie for sixth place. They lost in the second round of the A-10 women's tournament to Rhode Island.

2015–16 media
All non-televised Hawks home games will air on the A-10 Digital Network. All Hawks games will be streamed via the Saint Joseph's Sports Network on sjuhawks.com.

Roster

Schedule

|-
!colspan=9 style="background:#A00000; color:#726A5F;"| Non-conference regular season

|-
!colspan=9 style="background:#A00000; color:#726A5F;"| Atlantic 10 regular season

|-
!colspan=9 style="background:#990000; color:#FFFFFF;"| Atlantic 10 Women's Tournament

Rankings
2015–16 NCAA Division I women's basketball rankings

See also
 2015–16 Saint Joseph's Hawks men's basketball team

References

Saint Joseph's Hawks women's basketball seasons
Saint Josephs